Waiká, also Yanomám (or Yanomae, Yanomama, Yanomami), is one of several closely related languages spoken by the Yanomami people in Brazil. Most speakers are monolingual. For a grammatical description, see Yanomaman languages.

The names Waika (Guaica) and Yanomami are shared with the Yanomamö language.

References

Yanomaman languages
Subject–object–verb languages
Languages of Brazil